Ptah-Du-Auu was a nobleman and priest in ancient Egypt, who lived during the 4th dynasty. Ptah-Du-Auu was named after the god Ptah, whom he served.

Biography
Ptah-Du-Auu was the first known High Priest of Ptah. His titles were High Priest of the Ka of Ptah and Director of the Craftsmen of the Temple of Ptah of the White Wall.

He was buried at Saqqara. Dominique Mallet excavated his tomb in the late 1960s.

References

Ancient Egyptian priests
People of the Fourth Dynasty of Egypt
Memphis High Priests of Ptah